The ABC Supply Wisconsin 250 at Milwaukee IndyFest Presented by the Metro Milwaukee Honda Dealers was an IndyCar Series race held at the Milwaukee Mile in West Allis, Wisconsin.

History
Open wheel racing at the track dates back to  1937. AAA sanctioned races in 1937–1939, 1941, and 1946–1955. The track was paved in 1954.

USAC sanctioned Championship car races from 1956 to 1979. In 1980, the race switched to a CART/Champ Car race, and continued through 2006. IndyCar started holding races at the track in 2004, and thus for a brief time from 2004 to 2006, the track hosted both a Champ Car race (June) and an IndyCar race (August).

Starting in 2007, IndyCar became the lone event. The race was put on hiatus for 2010, stemming from management difficulties regarding payment of sanctioning fees. In 2011, the race returned and continued to be held through 2015.

After the 2011 race the promoter withdrew due to losses and the race was again at risk of cancellation.  Michael Andretti and Andretti Sports Marketing / ASM was asked by IndyCar to promote the event in order to keep the historic event on the series schedule.  In February 2012, Andretti announced the return of the race as the Milwaukee Indyfest and named longtime Andretti sponsor Kevin Healy  as the Managing Director of Andretti Sports Marketing and General Manager of the event.  The Milwaukee IndyFest transformed the standard race at the historic Milwaukee Mile to include an unprecedented infield festival reminiscent of street racing formats with vendors, paddock access, music stages, family zones and the signature Ferris Wheel.  The Milwaukee IndyFest ran for four years, with ABC Supply Co joining as the Title Sponsor in 2013.

Race scheduling
For most years starting in 1949, Milwaukee traditionally hosted the first race following the Indianapolis 500. From 1947 to 1982, Milwaukee generally hosted two races, the first race right after Indy in June, and the second in August or September. The latter sometimes in the days surrounding the Wisconsin State Fair.

After 1982, the second race was dropped. With only one race annually going forward, the track decided to keep the traditional June "right after Indy" date.

In 1986, the race was scheduled for Sunday June 1. However, due to rain on May 25–26, the Indianapolis 500 was postponed to Saturday May 31. After discussions with track, television, and series leaders, the Milwaukee race was pushed back one week to make the accommodation.

From 2004 to 2006, when both Champ Car and IndyCar were holding races at the track, Champ Car still utilized the June date, while IndyCar chose to hold their race in late July. In 2007, when IndyCar became the lone open wheel race at the track, there was a renewed interest in placing the event on its traditional June date immediately after Indy. This arrangement lasted only three years (2007-2009), as the race was put on hiatus for 2010.

When the race revived for 2011–2013, for a variety of reasons, race organizers decided to move the race to the Saturday of Father's Day weekend. Detroit took the weekend immediately after Indy, and Texas maintained its position on the second weekend of June. Starting in 2014, the race moved permanently to August, reviving the old state fair date.

Race history and facts
From 1950 to 1987, the June race was called the Rex Mays Classic, in honor of Rex Mays, a two-time AAA national champion killed in a race in 1949. Meanwhile, the August race was named the Tony Bettenhausen 200 from 1961 to 1982 in reference of Tony Bettenhausen, who died after a crash in 1961.

In the 1963 Tony Bettenhausen 200, Jim Clark and Team Lotus became the first to win an American Championship race with a rear-engined, monocoque car.  After finishing second in that year's Indianapolis 500, Lotus decided to run the car again at Milwaukee and Trenton.  Clark and teammate Dan Gurney broke the track record by over a second in qualifying, and Clark led all 200 laps to win, lapping the entire field except for second place A. J. Foyt.

Indianapolis 500/Milwaukee winners
For most years from 1949 to 2009, Milwaukee traditionally hosted a Championship/Indy car race the weekend immediately following the Indianapolis 500. Numerous drivers managed to win both races in the same year in back-to-back weeks.

1947: Bill Holland
1956: Pat Flaherty
1964: A. J. Foyt
1971: Al Unser Sr.
1974: Johnny Rutherford
1982: Gordon Johncock
1983: Tom Sneva
1988: Rick Mears
1994: Al Unser Jr.
2000: Juan Pablo Montoya (Indianapolis was an IRL race, Milwaukee was a CART series race)

Past winners

AAA Championship Car history

1937: Race shortened due to scoring error.
 Non-championship race
 Shared drive

USAC Championship Car history

 Shared drive

CART History

1994: Race shortened due to rain.
2005-06: This race used a time limit (1:45), standard for all CCWS races.

IRL IndyCar Series History

Support Race History

References

External links
Milwaukee IndyFest
Champ Car Stats Milwaukee archive

Milwaukee Indy 225
Recurring sporting events established in 1937